Leslie Dodds (born 12 October 1936) is an English retired professional footballer who played as a goalkeeper for Sunderland.

References

1936 births
Footballers from Newcastle upon Tyne
English footballers
Association football goalkeepers
Sunderland A.F.C. players
English Football League players
Living people